Fred K. Prieberg (3 June 1928 in Berlin – 28 March 2010 in Neuried) was a German musicologist. He was a pioneer in the field of history of music and musicians under the Nazi regime.

Works

Independent publications 
 Musik unterm Strich. Panorama der neuen Musik. Alber, Freiburg im Breisgau / München 1956, .
 Musik des technischen Zeitalters. Atlantis, Zürich 1956.
 Lexikon der neuen Musik. Alber, Freiburg im Breisgau / München 1958; Neuauflage 1982, .
 Musica ex machina. Über das Verhältnis von Musik und Technik. Ullstein, Berlin 1960.Musica ex Machina. (Translation into Italian: Paola Tonini). Einaudi, Turin 1963.
 Musik in der Sowjetunion. Verlag für Wissenschaft und Politik, Cologne 1965.
 Musik im anderen Deutschland. Verlag für Wissenschaft und Politik, Cologne 1968.
 Musik und Musikpolitik in Schweden. Herrenberg, Döring 1976.
 EM – Versuch einer Bilanz der elektronischen Musik. Rohrdorfer Musikverlag, Rohrdorf 1980, .
 Musik im NS-Staat. Fischer Taschenbuch Verlag, Frankfurt/M. 1982, .New edition: Dittrich, Cologne 2000, .
 Kraftprobe. Wilhelm Furtwängler im Dritten Reich. Brockhaus, Wiesbaden 1986, .Trial of strength. Wilhelm Furtwängler and the Third Reich. (translation in English: Christopher Dolan). Verlag Quartet Books, London 1991, . / Verlag Northeastern University Press, Boston 1994, .
 Musik und Macht. Fischer Taschenbuch Verlag, Frankfurt am Main 1991, .
 Mißbrauchte Tonkunst. Musik als Machtmedium. dtv, Munich 1991, .
 Der Komponist Hans Schaeuble: daß ich nicht vertreten bin…; ein biographischer Essay. With a catalogue of works by Chris Walton. published by the Hans-Schaeuble-Stiftung. Amadeus, Winterthur 2002
 Handbuch Deutsche Musiker 1933–1945. PDF auf CD-ROM, Kiel 2004. (2nd edition, Kiel 2009)Archiv-Inventar Deutsche Musik 1933–1945. (Auskopplung aus dem Handbuch). PDF o, CD-ROM, Kiel 2004. (2nd edition, Kiel 2009)

Further publications 
 Es gibt keine „neue“ Musik. In: Melos. Zeitschrift für zeitgenössische Musik. Schott, Mainz 1954, p. 310ff.
 Honeggers elektronisches Experiment. In: Melos. Zeitschrift für zeitgenössische Musik.  Schott, Mainz 1956, p. 20ff.
 Die Emanzipation des Geräusches. In: Melos. Zeitschrift für zeitgenössische Musik.  Schott, Mainz 1957, p. 9ff.
 Musikbücher. In: Melos. Zeitschrift für zeitgenössische Musik.  Schott, Mainz 1958, p. 91ff.
 Der musikalische Futurismus. In: Melos. Zeitschrift für zeitgenössische Musik.  Schott, Mainz 1958, p. 124ff.
 Italiens elektronische Musik. In: Melos. Zeitschrift für zeitgenössische Musik.  Schott, Mainz 1958, p. 194ff.
 Besuch in Polen. In: Melos. Zeitschrift für zeitgenössische Musik.  Schott, Mainz 1959, p. 43ff.
 Blick auf die Neue Musik mit Zeittafel der Neuen Musik. In: Prisma der gegenwärtigen Musik. Tendenzen und Probleme des zeitgenössischen Schaffens. Edited by Joachim E. Berendt and Jürgen Uhde. Furche, Hamburg 1959.
 García Lorca in der Neuen Musik. In: Melos. Zeitschrift für zeitgenössische Musik. Schott, Mainz 1960, p. 331ff.
 Kunst und staatlviche Kontrolle. Beitrag zu einer Diskussion. In: Deutsche Rundschau (with a catalogue of works by Chris Walton (edited by Jürgen und Peter Pechel). Verlag Deutsche Rundschau, Baden-Baden 1962,88. Jg., H. 11 November 1962.
 Elektronische Musik aus Lochstreifen. In: Melos. Zeitschrift für zeitgenössische Musik. Schott, Mainz 1964, Heft 4, p. 118ff.
 Der junge Schönberg und seine Kritiker. In: Melos. Zeitschrift für zeitgenössische Musik. Schott, Mainz 1964, p. 264ff.
 Imaginäres Gespräch mit Luciano Berio. In: Melos. Zeitschrift für zeitgenössische Musik. Schott, Mainz 1965, p. 158ff.
 Musik als sozialpolitische Erscheinung. Beispiel Schweden. In: Melos. Zeitschrift für zeitgenössische Musik. Schott, Mainz 1972, p.334ff.
 Zwanzig Fragen an Milko Kelemen. In: Melos. Zeitschrift für zeitgenössische Musik. Schott, Mainz 1974, p. 65ff.
 Schweden – Muster oder Monster des Musiklebens? In: Melos/Neue Zeitschrift für Musik Schott, Mainz 1977, Heft 2, p. 123ff.
 Die Rolle des Musikschaffenden im NS-Staat. In: Aspekte der Musik im NS-Staat. Hrsg. vom AStA der Staatlichen Hochschule für Musik Rheinland (S. Kames and M. Pannes; reproduced as manuscript), Cologne 1984.
 Nach dem „Endsieg“ oder Musik-Mimikry. In: Hanns-Werner Heister, Hans-Günter Klein: Musik und Musikpolitik im faschistischen Deutschland. Fischer Taschenbuch Verlag, Frankfurt/M. 1984, .
 Foreword and comments on Berta Geissmar: Musik im Schatten der Politik. Erinnerungen. Atlantis, Zürich 1985, 4th edition, as well as the new edition under the title: Taktstock und Schaftstiefel. Erinnerungen an Wilhelm Furtwängler. Dittrich, Cologne 2000, .

Translations from English 
 Erle Stanley Gardner: Hubschrauber, Höhlen, Hindernisse: Flug zu den geheimnisvollen Schluchten Kaliforniens. Ullstein, Berlin 1962.
 Joy Adamson: Für immer frei. Ullstein, Berlin 1964.
 Lawrence Langner: Vom Sinn und Unsinn der Kleidung. With a foreword by Hans Habe. Ullstein 1964.
 John Fairchild: Magier, Meister und Modelle. Modeschöpfer und Mode-Idole von heute. Lorch, Frankfurt/M. 1967.

Reviews of his work 
 Besprechung von Musik im NS-Staat. In: Der Spiegel dated 15 February 1982.
 Besprechung von Kraftprobe. Wilhelm Furtwängler im Dritten Reich von Carl Dahlhaus. In: Die Zeit dated 7 November 1986.
 Peter Brixius: Entdeckungsreise in unbewältigte Vergangenheit. Fred K. Priebergs „Handbuch Deutscher Musiker 1933–1945“. In: neue musikzeitung, April 2005, p. 45.
 Fred K. Prieberg weiß alles über Musiker im Dritten Reich von Jens Malte Fischer. In: Die Welt 12 August 2006.

References

External links 
 
 Das Prieberg-Archiv an der Universität Kiel
 Fred K. Prieberg: Carl Orff - von Moskau aus gesehen (in German) Die Zeit 30 April 1964

Musicologists from Berlin
Historians of Nazism
1928 births
2010 deaths